Polen Records is an independent music label based in Bogota, Colombia. Created in 2006 by producer Felipe Alvarez. Polen Record's first release was Bajotierra's Los Días Adelante (2006), followed by Bomba Estéreo's debut EP, Vol.1, and Chocquibtown's classic album, Somos Pacífico, later came Estalla the iconic album of Bomba Estéreo that includes the hit Fuego .

Since then, Polen Records has released some of the most important bands of the latin electronic scene of Colombia and  South America. In 2013, Polen was nominated at the Latin Grammy Awards with Bomba Estéreo's album Elegancia Tropical (2012) as Best Alternative Music Album.

Artists and releases (past and present) 
 Bajotierra: Los Días Adelante, 2006
 Bomba Estéreo
 - Vol. 1, 2006 
 - Estalla, 2008. Reissued the following year in the United States as Blow Up (Nacional Records, 2009)
 - Elegancia Tropical, 2012
 - Qué bonito (single), 2014
 Ella Fuksbrauner: Ink, 2010
 Sidestepper: 15:The Best of 1996-2011, 2011
 Mucho Indio: Mucho Indio, 2011
 Mitú
 - Potro, 2012
 - Balnear, 2014
 Crew Peligrosos: Medayork, 2012
 Cero39: Móntate en el viaje, 2012
 Bareto: album Cumbia (2008) released in Colombia in 2014
 Systema Solar: Rumbo a Tierra, 2016
 Rionegro: Rionegro, 2016

See also
 Codiscos
 Discos Fuentes

References 
 Article about Bomba Esteréo in Rock Paper Cissors
 Polen Records' page on Womex website
 Article in Spanish in Cartel Urbano 
 Article in Spanish about Polen Records' 7th anniversary in Shock.co
Article in Spanish about the most relevant independent labels from Colombia in Noisey

External links 
 Polen Records' official website

Record labels established in 2006
Colombian record labels